NXT Super Tuesday was a two-week long professional wrestling television special episode of WWE's weekly television series NXT, broadcast on the USA Network. It took place on September 1 (taped August 26) and September 8, 2020 at Full Sail University in Winter Park, Florida.

Production

Background 
Because of a scheduling conflict with the 2020 NHL Stanley Cup playoffs on USA Network in NXTs normal Wednesday night time slot, the show was temporarily moved to Tuesday night for a two-week period. As with WWE's other NXT events during the COVID-19 pandemic since mid-March, the two-week event was presented from a behind closed doors set at NXT's home base of Full Sail University in Winter Park, Florida.

Storylines 
NXT Super Tuesday featured professional wrestling matches that involved different wrestlers from pre-existing scripted feuds and storylines. Wrestlers portrayed heroes, villains, or less distinguishable characters in scripted events that built tension and culminated in a wrestling match or series of matches.

At NXT TakeOver XXX, Karrion Kross successfully defeated Keith Lee to win the NXT Championship. However, after the match, it was learned that Kross had legitimately separated his shoulder at some point during the bout, forcing Kross to relinquish the championship on the August 26th episode of NXT, due to an inability to be medically cleared to compete. Later in the show, NXT general manager William Regal announced a 60 minute Fatal 4-Way iron man match between Johnny Gargano, Finn Bálor, Tommaso Ciampa, and Adam Cole to crown a new champion on Super Tuesday.

Reception 
NXT Super Tuesday averaged 849,000 viewers with a 0.26 rating in the 18-49 key demographic for the first week and 838,000 viewers with a 0.22 rating for the second week. The first week was #10 in the top 10 programs watched on cable, while its position fell to #15 for the second week. These were their best viewership and key demo numbers since their last TV special, The Great American Bash.

Results

Iron man match

See also
2020 in professional wrestling

Notes

References

External links
 

September 2020 events in the United States
Events in Florida
Professional wrestling in Winter Park, Florida
2020 in professional wrestling in Florida
2020 in professional wrestling
Impact of the COVID-19 pandemic on television
WWE NXT